Brookfield (2021 population: 439) is a Canadian rural community located in southern Colchester County, Nova Scotia, Canada. Brookfield is a growing community in the heart of Nova Scotia, just forty minutes from the provincial capital of Halifax, thirty minutes from the Stanfield International Airport and ten minutes from the Town of Truro. The community hosts both levels of public schools, two churches, restaurants, a bakery, a service station, a sportsplex, an 18 hole golf course, and a volunteer fire service.

Surrounded by farming areas and forestry, Brookfield is located along Highway 102 and Trunk 2 where they intersect with Route 289.

History 

Brookfield was founded in 1784 by William Hamilton and Daniel Moore. 2009 marked 225 years of settlement in Brookfield and the community received the Lieutenant Governor's Community Spirit Award at a July 18 ceremony marking the opening of Coming Home to Brookfield Days, 2009.

Demographics 

Sports teams

Brookfield Elks Junior B Hockey Team

The team currently plays in the Nova Scotia Junior Hockey League (NSJHL). The league consists of 12 teams from all over Nova Scotia. The franchise began in 1995 and the team was known as the Colchester Titans. The team was then moved to the Don Henderson Memorial Sportplex and the name was changed to the Colchester Eagles in the 1996 season. The team finally became the Brookfield Elks franchise we know today in 1997. - Junior B Elks Hockey

The Brookfield Elks make their home the Don Henderson Memorial Sportsplex at 55 Carter Road in Brookfield, Nova Scotia.

1980 Brookfield Elks Senior 'A' Softball Team

The Brookfield Elks Senior 'A' Softball team realized a long sought-after dream in 1980 when they became the first team east of Ontario to capture the national crown. The year marked their fourth straight Nova Scotia Championship and their fourth straight trip to Nationals.

Notable residents 

 James Hill (Canadian musician)
 John McPherson, poet
Jane Soley Hamilton, pioneer midwife, 1805-1897

References

External links 
 http://brookfieldnovascotia.ca/
 http://jrbelks.goalline.ca/

Communities in Colchester County
Designated places in Nova Scotia